The name Kishon may refer to:
Kishon River, a river in northern Israel
Kishon Port, a port in the Haifa Bay area of Haifa, Israel near Haifa Airport; located at the mouth of the Kishon River. Part of the Port of Haifa.
Ephraim Kishon, (1924 – 2005) an Israeli satirist
Sara Kishon (1931 – 2002), Israeli pianist, art collector, and the wife of Ephraim Kishon
Kishon Khan (born 1970), Bangladeshi-born British jazz pianist
21010 Kishon (1988 PL2), a main-belt asteroid discovered on 1988

Hebrew-language surnames